Saadhanai is a 1986 Indian Tamil-language drama film directed by A. S. Prakasam. The film stars Sivaji Ganesan, his son Prabhu, K. R. Vijaya and Nalini. It was released on 10 January 1986.

Plot 
Sivaji is a director whose dream project is to make the love saga of Salim and Anarkali. After a long search for an apt girl to fit into the role of Anarkali, he finds it in a beggar. He starts the movie with Nalini as Anarkali. K. R. Vijaya, wife of Sivaji starts suspecting Sivaji and Nalini's relationship and this results in turmoil inside their family. Nalini learns of this and feels that because of her, her mentor's life should not be in a mess, she leaves them without notice.  Sivaji stops the project. Years later, Sivaji has a son and Prabhu, who is into spirituality and wishes to lead life as a bachelor. Sivaji on one occasion, watches a dance by Bhuvani and jumps in glory that he has again found his Anarkali in that danseuse. He discovers that the girl who danced was Nalini's daughter. Nalini's daughter is now chosen as Anarkali and Prabhu is selected as Salim. Prabhu and Bhuvani fall in love in real life too. As the drama unfolds, finally Prabhu and Bhuvani die by taking poison in a touching climax.

Cast 
 Sivaji Ganesan
 Prabhu
 K. R. Vijaya
 Nalini
 Bhuvani
 Senthil
 Ilaiyaraaja as himself
 Puvani

Music 
The soundtrack was composed by Ilaiyaraaja. The lyrics for the songs were written by Vaali, Vairamuthu and Pulamaipithan.

Reception 
Jayamanmadhan of Kalki wrote the film had exciting events till the interval but felt the climax was pure mess.

References

External links 
 

1980s Tamil-language films
1986 drama films
1986 films
Films about filmmaking
Films scored by Ilaiyaraaja
Films set in Tamil Nadu
Films shot in Tamil Nadu
Indian drama films